Mohammad Hadi "Hesam" Yaghoubi (born March 29, 1991) is an Iranian footballer.

Club career
Yaghoubi Started his career with Malavan from youth levels. He was promoted to the first team in mid-2011.

Club career statistics

References

External links
 Mohammad Hadi Yaghoubi at PersianLeague.com
 Mohammad Hadi Yaghoubi at IranLeague.ir

1991 births
Living people
Malavan players
Iranian footballers
Association football midfielders